Muhammad 'Afi bin Aminuddin is a Bruneian international footballer who plays as a defender for Kasuka FC of the Brunei Super League.

Club career
Afi attended Brunei Sports School, the institution that also produced Brunei international footballers such as Azwan Ali Rahman and Hazwan Hamzah. He was drafted into professional club DPMM FC playing in the Singapore league in 2010, but due to the ban imposed by FIFA on Brunei he was sent on loan to Indera SC along with five other players.

Afi signed full terms with Indera not long after and has won two league championships with them. After four seasons, he transferred to Kota Ranger FC. He scored his first goal for the Rangers in the penultimate game of the season, a 1-1 draw with MS PDB on 18 February 2018. He was appointed club captain from the 2018-19 season, then led the team to winning the 2018-19 Brunei FA Cup on 22 April 2019 in a 2–1 victory.

Afi exited Kota Ranger after three years and signed for Kasuka FC in June 2021. In the following year, he played in the final of the FA Cup, losing 2–1 to brother Wafi's team DPMM FC.

International career

Afi played all six games in Brunei U21s' maiden Hassanal Bolkiah Trophy victory in 2012. He also turned out for the under-23s at the 2013 SEA Games.

Afi made his international debut for Brunei on 26 September 2012 in a 0–5 loss against Indonesia. He was ever-present in the 2012 AFF Suzuki Cup qualification but did not play at all for the 2014 edition. He was called up for the 2018 FIFA World Cup qualifiers against Chinese Taipei in March 2015, but did not take the field. A year later, he was selected for the 2016 AFF Suzuki Cup qualification but only appeared once as a substitute.

After Kwon Oh-son was reinstated as the national team head coach, he re-utilized Afi who had played regularly for him for his first match back at the helm at the 2016 AFC Solidarity Cup held in Kuching, Malaysia. Afi became the regular centre-back for fourth-placed Brunei in the tournament, appearing in four matches overall.

Afi was again selected by Kwon for the Brunei squad contesting the 2018 AFF Suzuki Cup qualification matches against Timor-Leste in early September.

Helped by his impressive form for Kota Ranger in 2019, he was picked for the 2022 World Cup qualification matches against Mongolia in June. He subsequently made two appearances as a substitute.

Honours

Team
Indera SC
Brunei Super League (2): 2012–13, 2014
Kota Ranger FC
Brunei FA Cup: 2018-19
 Piala Sumbangsih: 2020

International
Brunei national under-21 football team
Hassanal Bolkiah Trophy: 2012

Individual
 
  Meritorius Service Medal (PJK) (2012)

Personal life
Afi has three brothers who are also footballers. Younger brother Wafi Aminuddin plays for Brunei's professional football team DPMM FC. Another brother Ulfi Aminuddin was a Brunei under-18 international and has represented the country in futsal. The youngest brother, Bazli is a Brunei youth international.

References

External links

1991 births
Living people
Association football defenders
Bruneian footballers
Brunei international footballers
Indera SC players
Competitors at the 2013 Southeast Asian Games
Southeast Asian Games competitors for Brunei